Russ George (Darcy Russel George; born 6 December 1949) is an American businessman and entrepreneur best known for founding the San Francisco–based firm Planktos Inc. which claims to "restore ecosystems and slow climate change". In 2007 he provided testimony to the House Select Committee on Energy Independence and Global Warming. The ecorestoration treeplanting company he founded in Canada in 1973 originally called Coast Range has planted upwards of 250 million trees, and continues even now. He used to be member of Greenpeace and was part of the crew of the Rainbow Warrior, though today he considers Greenpeace one of his greatest opponents.
In the 90s, he founded several companies conducting Cold Fusion research.

Cold Fusion and other diverse ventures 

In the late 1980s, Russell embraced the idea of near limitless energy from the fusion of atoms after hearing of the Fleischmann–Pons experiment.

Shortly after, in 1989, Darcy Russ George and Ronald A. Brightsen founded Clustron Science Corp. in Order to conduct Experiments regarding Cold Fusion themselves.

In 1998, Russ George founded Saturna Technologies and eWorld Travel Corp. an Internet Travel Service Company, which was renamed to GYK Ventures Inc. in 2002, then renamed a second time to Diatom Corp. in 2005.

In March 2005, he incorporated a company named D2Fusion Inc. which would supposedly produce and sell fusion-powered heating devices.

Carbon Credits business / Ocean Pasture Restoration

In August 2005, George sold Planktos Inc. and D2Fusion Inc. to a Vancouver-based company named Solar Energy Ltd. for a stated value of $1.5 million and $2 million respectively. Solar on the other hand agreed to sell Planktos Inc. to another company named Diatom Corp. which was renamed to Planktos Corp. to reflect this acquisition. The name change became effective March 7, 2007.

In May 2007, Planktos Corp. announced plans their to dissolve 100 tons of iron over a 10 000 square kilometer area on the high seas near the Galápagos Islands, the first of six planned large-scale operations Planktos was planning to conduct in the Atlantic and Pacific Ocean from 2007 to 2009. These plans caught the attention of the several NGOs, the first of which was the eco-justice ETC Group, which raised alarm about the large-scale geoengineering project.

This in turn caused other organizations to take notice of Planktos Corp:

 In the middle of June 2007, Sea Shepherd UK published a statement that one of their vessels would be able to monitor movements of any Planktos vessels and intercept them if necessary. The Organization also stated that they were investigating the possibility of criminal charges against Planktos Inc.

The start of the operation was delayed by almost three months due to supply delays, but finally, on November 5, 2007, the Planktos-owned, US-registered vessel Weatherbird II set sail, departing from Fort Lauderdale for an yet unknown location.

Unbeknownst to the organizations attempting to put a halt to these operations, a change of plans had taken place, and instead of heading for Galápagos, the vessel set course on the Bermudas for a refueling stop, intending to cruise across the Atlantic and conduct the operation near the Canary Islands instead in order to avoid confrontation with the Sea Shepherds.

Much to the surprise of Sea Shepherds, on November 14, 2007, the vessel appeared in the harbor of St. Georges, where it refueled as planned. At this point, the vessel had no iron dust aboard, with Planktos attempting to obtain the required iron for the experiment dust from ground-up metal scrap instead, contradicting earlier claims of using virgin iron dust in the experiment as well as leading to concerns whether the iron used would be contaminated by oils or impurities. Two days later, the vessel departed for the Canary Islands.

The vessel was denied port entry in the Canary Islands by local authorities in December 2007,
after which the vessel spent several days drifting about before heading northwards to the island of Madeira. Several days later, the company announced to wind down its business due to “unanticipated events in the Canary Islands”.
On 13 February 2008, the company announced that funds had run dry and all operations were being postponed indefinitely.
In March, the Weatherbird II was sold to an oil exploration interest.

Haida Salmon Restoration Corporation 

In 2012, the Haida Salmon Restoration Corporation decided on conducting an 'ocean pasture restoration experiment' by spreading more than 100 tonnes of an iron-rich dirt-like substance over a large area in the Pacific Ocean. Russel George was chosen to act as the lead scientist of this operation.

In July 2012, George departed from Victoria with a crew of 11 on a chartered fishing vessel named the Ocean Pearl, loaded with 100 tons of iron-rich nutrient. The vessel exited the Strait of Juan de Fuca and headed northwards into the Gulf of Alaska until they reached the currents known as the Haida Eddies, approximately 200 miles westward of the coast of Haida Gwaii. The crew spent the next weeks zigzagging the ship over the ocean while mixing the 4 000 50-lb bags of nutrients with seawater and pumping them overboard using a hose before returning to Victoria to take 20 more tons of nutrient aboard to repeat the process in August. As of 2022, this remains by far the largest Iron fertilization operation in history.

George claimed this resulted in increased growth of phytoplankton over 10,000 square miles. Some critics asserted George's actions were illegal while others have argued that they were not. Scientists were especially concerned regarding the fact that previous similar Experiments, like the EisenEx experiment conducted in November 2009 had shown that fertilizing the ocean with iron in this manner would especially promote the growth of a genus of microalgae known as Pseudo-nitzschia which in turn produces large quantities of Domoic acid, a potentially deadly neurotoxin which accumulates through the food chain. The Canadian Food Inspection Agency reported a significant increase in concentrations of Domoic acid on the northern coast of Haida Gwaii in the latter half of 2012, and citizens of Old Masset reported with unease that the island was hit by the strongest red tides ever seen there.

However, Professor Victor Smetacek, a top authority from the Alfred Wegener Institute for Polar and Marine Research in Germany, who has done many experiments in the oceans with Ocean Pasture Restoration, or OPR, related projects, had this to say about OPR safety concerns: “In general, the claim that OPR may cause harmful algal blooms (HABs) and lead to closure of fisheries in coastal waters is completely unfounded. Specifically, the National Academy of Sciences report mentions that OPR does not pose a threat of HABs in the open deep ocean. I fully agree with this.” The Haida project, and all OPR projects, are only conducted in the deep ocean.

Critics allege violations of the United Nations Convention on Biological Diversity (CBD) and the London Convention on the Dumping of Wastes at Sea which contain moratoriums on geoengineering experiments. Parties to the London Convention and London Protocol expressed grave concerns about this experiment.

Romany M. Webb,  Senior Fellow and Associate Research Scholar for the Sabin Center for Climate Change Law at  Columbia Law School answered this way: “The parties to the Convention on Biological Diversity have adopted a resolution, which says that countries should avoid “ocean fertilization activities,” except those conducted as part of small-scale scientific research projects in coastal waters. Notably, however, the resolution is not legally binding. So, provided countries complied with other provisions of the Convention on Biological Diversity, they could go ahead with the (OPR) type of project.” Webb added that the amendment to the London Protocol that relates to OPR has not “yet entered into force so, at the moment, has no legal effect.”

Edward A. (Ted) Parson, the Dan and Rae Emmett Professor of Environmental Law and Faculty Co-director of the Emmett Institute on Climate Change and the Environment at the University of California, Los Angeles said about the Haida project at the time, “There’s a ruckus going on over an experiment in ocean fertilization conducted off the coast of British Columbia in July and disclosed this week. The Haida Salmon Restoration Corporation, an enterprise of the Haida village of Old Massett, used a large fishing vessel to spread 100 tons of iron sulfate-rich dust on the ocean surface west of Haida Gwaii (or the Queen Charlotte Islands). The aim of the release was to increase plankton growth and there promote growth of fisheries and maybe also remove carbon from the atmosphere. Such interventions exist in a near legal vacuum. Critics of the Old Massett Haida project are claiming it violates international law, but this is simply not true. Mainly due to vigorous lobbying by a couple of small NGOs (the same ones now outraged at the Haida project), parties to the CBD have adopted two decisions discouraging ocean fertilization, and geoengineering generally. But these are purely advisory – and are moreover so clumsily drafted that even if they were legally binding (which they are not), their operational meaning would be utterly opaque… Nations are under no legal obligation to refrain from ocean fertilization research, nor to submit proposals to any international process.” Search warrants were executed by Environment Canada's enforcement branch to investigate Russ George's office concerning the iron enrichment he performed in 2012 off the coast of British Columbia.

John Disney, President of the Haida Salmon Restoration Corporation, made this statement on October 19, 2012: "Our project has generated a great deal of media attention both nationally and internationally. I want to tell you about the project, what we did, how we did it. This project was not entered into lightly. And we have complied with every necessary aspect of the ocean governance before undertaking the work. I want to make very clear: we do not consider micronutrient replenishment of a naturally occurring substance to be pollution. We are using this for restoration purposes, to restore the salmon back to their rightful place in the Old Massey economy. We have created a great team, working to develop the knowledge that will allow us to have a sustainable future, and that is the guiding principle of the company. As President, I am very cognisant of all of the requirements of the scientific and legal nature that applies to this project. I’d like to say that at this time that the international media and national media seems to have focused on Russ George who we brought in as our Chief Scientist. I want to make this emphatically clear: Russ George did not, I’m saying did not come to us to dupe us or sell us a bill of goods. We approached him, and we based that on ten years of work with him in other fields. I’ve known Russ for over ten years and I’ll tell you something that is very rare: he has never once lied to me, he’s only told me the truth, he has a great integrity, and he’s never let us down. And every time he’s told me something that I thought was unbelievable I’ve checked it out and he’s always been right. And I challenge anyone else in the corporate world to come up with that about a person. Russ has one aim in life: he wants to try and make the planet a better place. That’s it. I don’t care what else you read."

In May 2013, the Haida Salmon Restoration Corporation removed George as a director of the company and ended his employment. Russ George sued the Haida Salmon Restoration Corporation, its directors, and several others in 2014. In a counterclaim the Haida Salmon Restoration Corporation claimed that Russ George lied about his credentials and academic qualifications, assaulted the project leader, and acted in an "irrational, unprofessional and offensive manner". In 2016, Russ George was ordered to pay security for legal costs.

On July 15, 2014, the oceanographic scientific data gathered during the project was made publicly available under the ODbL license.

The experiment did result in an unusually large phytoplankton bloom that lasted at least until September 2012, when it became increasingly difficult to detect as the biomass dispersed into the surrounding waters. In the seas of Southeast Alaska, the relevant area of the experiment, the expected catch of Pink Salmon in 2013 was predicted by salmon experts and managers to be 54 million fish. The catch turned out to be 224 million Pinks, the largest catch in Canadian history. Russ has claimed this to be definitive Proof of the success of the Experiment, despite claims that no definitive link between the experiment and the higher levels of the food chain (including Salmon) could be determined. Research conducted on 13 major iron-fertilization experiments in the open ocean since 1990 determined that the method is unproven; with respect to the Haida Gwaii project, "scientists have seen no evidence that the experiment worked", concluded a 2017 article in Nature.

References

External links
 Russ George Personal Blog
 Pasture Partners (Inactive since 2014)
 Planktos Inc.
 Planktos Science (Webarchive)
 Supplemental materials from Russ George to House Select Committee on Energy Independence and Global Warming
 Profile of Russ George by Bruce Falconer in Pacific Standard
 The highly controversial plan to stop climate change - Freethink
  Des tonnes de sulfate de fer déversées dans le Pacifique

Living people
1949 births
American businesspeople
North American environmentalists
Place of birth missing (living people)